Denise Holly Hobbie (née Ulinskas; 1944) is an American writer, watercolorist and illustrator. Holly Hobbie is also the name of a fictional character she created.

Personal life
She is from Connecticut and married Douglas Hobbie in 1964. She resides in Conway, Massachusetts.

Born Holly Ulinskas from Watertown, CT

Career

Author
Hobbie is the author of the popular Toot & Puddle children's books and the creator of the character bearing her name.

Namesake character

Origin
In the late 1960s, at the encouragement of her brother-in-law, Hobbie sold distinctive artwork of a cat-loving, rag dress-wearing little girl in a giant bonnet to American Greetings in Cleveland, Ohio. The artwork, based on Hobbie's own children and with rustic New England style of a bygone era, became popular, and her originally nameless character (identified earlier as "blue girl") became known as Holly Hobbie. As a contract artist, Hobbie worked with the Humorous Planning department at American Greetings under art director Rex Connors, who was responsible for launching "blue girl" as the most identifiable of the Hobbie characters.

Doll and other product licensing
Also working in Humorous Planning at that time (1973-74) was Bob Childers, a veteran humorous concept artist and designer. Childers insisted that there should be a doll of the character. Since no one seemed to listen, Childers went home and, on his own time, hand-stitched the first prototype and presented it to Connors, who took the cloth doll to Tom Wilson, Creative Vice President. American Greetings approached Knickerbocker Toy Company concerning the Holly Hobbie license. In 1974, Knickerbocker Toys licensed the Holly Hobbie character for a line of rag dolls, launched in 1975. These were a popular toy for young American girls for several years. Additional products were licensed and produced, including fabrics, furniture, ceramics, games, and stationery. Holly Hobbie products were later marketed by American Greetings in association with Carlton Cards.

In 1976, Coleco produced a toy oven similar to Kenner's Easy-Bake Oven called the Holly Hobbie Oven. It was shaped like an old-fashioned wood-powered cookstove, used an incandescent light bulb for heat, and came with packaged mixes that could also be bought separately.

In 1980, Holly was featured in The Adventures of Holly Hobbie, a novel by Richard Dubelman. In this book, Holly Hobbie is a ghost who lives in a painting from 1803. She comes out of the painting to help a descendant, Liz Dutton, find her missing father, an archaeologist who has vanished in Guatemala.

Updated versions
Beginning in 1989 and into the 1990s, Holly Hobbie dolls were produced by Tomy. Knickerbocker Toys also began producing dolls, but these were vinyl doll heads with soft bodies, unlike the original cloth dolls (rag dolls).

In 2006, a redesigned Holly Hobbie was introduced with the launch of Holly Hobbie & Friends, a series of specials that were broadcast on Nickelodeon's Nick Jr. block and the separate Noggin channel. They were also released on DVD. The traditional line still exists, with the back story that the "original" Holly is the great great grandmother of the "new" Holly. 

Concurrently, Mattel released an updated Holly Hobbie doll line, which includes Holly (blue eyes and blonde hair), Amy (green eyes and red hair), and Carrie (brown eyes and black hair). The dolls feature all-new face sculpts, a new body style, and flat feet. There is also a series of smaller Holly, Amy, and Carrie figures; each of these figures includes a companion animal: Holly a cocker spaniel named Doodles, Amy a pig named Cheddar, and Carrie a cat named Bonnet. Separate doll outfits were available, and each outfit could be customized. Porcelain dolls were available, made by the Ashton-Drake company.

The specials feature songs with music and lyrics written by lead guitarist Sheriff Mandy Collins and keyboardist Charlotte Spencer of the English rock group the Hyper Girls. The cartoon features three pop songs, two sung in her own voice, "Just Like You" and "The Things That Make You Special." LeAnn Rimes sings the third song, "Twinkle in Her Eye," the show's theme song.

In fall 2018, Family Channel and Hulu released an updated live-action series simply titled Holly Hobbie. It features Ruby Jay as thirteen-year-old Holly Hobbie, a country girl who enjoys playing the guitar, hailing from a small town and seeking to save her grandmother's Calico Café. The series draws loosely upon past elements created for the Holly Hobbie franchise, but includes modern elements, such as Holly's use of a crowdfunding page.

Works

Toot & Puddle series
Toot & Puddle are best friends, even though Toot likes to travel and Puddle likes to stay at home in Woodcock Pocket.

Books
 Toot & Puddle 
 A Present for Toot 
 You Are My Sunshine 
 Puddle's ABC 
 I'll Be Home For Christmas 
 Top of the World 
 Charming Opal
 The New Friend
 Wish You Were Here 
 The One and Only 
 Let It Snow
 How Does Your Garden Grow?

Television show
A TV series based on the books was made in 2008 by Mercury Filmworks, National Geographic Kids, and Treehouse TV. It was titled Toot & Puddle.

Film
In December 2006, Toot & Puddle: I'll Be Home for Christmas aired on Treehouse in Canada and on Noggin in the US. It was released on DVD by National Geographic.

Holly Hobbie & Friends

A series of specials starring the Holly Hobbie character. The DVD releases were:
Holly Hobbie & Friends: Surprise Party 7 March 2006
Holly Hobbie & Friends: Christmas Wishes 24 October 2006
Holly Hobbie & Friends: Secret Adventures 6 March 2007
Holly Hobbie & Friends: Best Friends Forever 18 September 2007
Holly Hobbie & Friends: Fabulous Fashion Show 12 August 2008
Holly Hobbie & Friends: Marvelous Makeover 3 February 2009
Holly Hobbie & Friends: Hey Girls! Fun Pack 12 August 2008

Other books
 Elmore (2018)
 A Cat Named Swan (2017)
 The night before Christmas (Text by Clement Clarke Moore) (2013)
 Gem (2012)
 Fanny (2008)
 Fanny & Annabelle (2009)
 Everything But The Horse: A Childhood Memory (2010)
 The Art of Holly Hobbie (1980)
 Holly Hobbie's the night before Christmas (1976)

References

External links

  of the TV series

1944 births
American children's writers
American illustrators
Artists from Massachusetts
Living people
Writers from Massachusetts
People from Conway, Massachusetts